was a Japanese video game developer founded in 1994 by former Toaplan employees after the latter company declared bankruptcy the same year.

History 
After Toaplan declared bankruptcy, Gazelle was founded by Tatsuya Uemura, Junya Inoue, Mikio Yamaguchi, Kaneyo Ōhira, and Yoshitatsu Sakai.  The new firm originally focused on printed circuit board exportation prior to game development. Cave co-founder Tsuneki Ikeda refused to join the company. According to Uemura, his former Toaplan CEO sold the company's IPs to both Gazelle and Raizing but doubted about the procedure's overall legality. During its existence, Gazelle developed three arcade titles for Banpresto, utilizing Atlus's chipset and platform: Pretty Soldier Sailor Moon, Air Gallet, and Quiz Bishōjo Senshi Sailor Moon: Chiryoku Tairyoku Toki no Un. The company also ported three Toaplan titles to fifth generation game consoles, among other projects. Prior to ceasing game development and closure, many of the company's staff later joined Cave and Raizing.

Games developed

Notes

References 

Defunct video game companies of Japan
Video game companies established in 1994
Video game companies disestablished in 2002
Video game development companies